Paolo Piffarerio (August 27, 1924 – June 30, 2015) was an Italian comics artist and animator.

Biography
Born in Recanati, the son of a  silversmith and a seamstress, Piffarerio studied at the Brera Academy, where he knew Gino Gavioli, with whom he founded "Gamma Film", a  company considered a pioneer in the field of Italian animation. With Gavioli and Gamma Film Piffarerio realized several animation shorts for Carosello, as well as The Long Green Sock, a 1961 medium length film about the history of Italy  written by  Cesare Zavattini. 

Piffarerio started his activity as a comics artist while studying at the Brera Academy, where he created the comic character, Capitan Falco, in 1943. He collaborated with Max Bunker to a number of comics series, such as Viva l'Italia (1961), Maschera Nera (1963), El Gringo (1965) and  Alan Ford, he illustrated for about one hundred issues between 1975 and 1984. Piffarerio also collaborated with Enzo Biagi for his La storia d'Italia a fumetti, and was author of a number of comics adaptations of novels and historical biographies for Il Giornalino.

References

 
 

Italian comics artists
Italian animators
Italian animated film directors
Italian animated film producers
1924 births
2015 deaths
People from Recanati
Brera Academy alumni